To "throw (someone) under the bus" is an idiomatic phrase in English meaning to blame or abandon a person for selfish reasons. It is typically used to describe a disavowal of a previously amicable relationship to avoid being associated with something controversial or embarrassing.

Origins
It seems possible that the expression throw/push/shove someone under the bus comes from Britain in the late 1970s or early 1980s. The earliest known usage of this phrase was 21 June 1982, when Julian Critchley of The Times (London) wrote "President Galtieri had pushed her under the bus which the gossips had said was the only means of her removal."

After Julian Critchley, a relatively early use is attributed by the website Double-Tongued Dictionary to a 1991 article in the Colorado Springs Gazette-Telegraph.

Cyndi Lauper is sometimes wrongly quoted as saying in The Washington Post in 1984: "In the rock 'n' roll business, you are either on the bus or under it. Playing 'Feelings' with Eddie and the Condos in a buffet bar in Butte is under the bus." However, those lines were written by journalist David Remnick in an article about Lauper, but they are not attributed in the article to her or anyone else.

Use in 2008 US political discourse
The phrase was picked up by the US media during the 2008 political primary season. It has frequently been used to describe various politicians distancing themselves from suddenly unpopular or controversial figures with whom the candidate has previously allied themselves. David Segal, a writer for The Washington Post, calls the expression "the cliché of the 2008 campaign".

In a March 2008 NPR report, the linguist Geoff Nunberg noted that "under the bus" "has appeared in more than 400 press stories on the campaign over the last six months".

Other examples
 Daily Telegraph article "Barack Obama's former pastor says President 'threw him under bus'". (referring to the Jeremiah Wright controversy)
 Wired magazine asked "Did Egypt's Army Just Throw Mubarak Under the Bus?" after the Egyptian Army issued a statement saying it will not crack down on protesters during the Egyptian Revolution of 2011. 
 ZDNet held a debate that asked, "Did Microsoft throw users under the bus?" after their announcement of Windows Phone 8.
 The Boston Globe headlined a story that asserted NFL coach "Bill Belichick throws Tom Brady under the bus" during the Deflategate scandal.
 The Haiti Sentinel published an article entitled "Election fraud: Red Cross throws Health Ministry under the bus" when the president of the agency said it was illegal for the Haitian government to use its brand and insignia on its vehicles. He was denying accusations that the international relief organization assisted in electoral fraud.
 Shortly after Ann Curry was released from her co-hosting duties on The Today Show, Today Show weatherman Al Roker hinted on-air that it was senior cohost Matt Lauer who "threw" Ann "under the bus".
 New York City's Patrolmen's Benevolent Association's president Patrick Lynch accused mayor Bill de Blasio of doing this to the NYPD in 2014 when de Blasio spoke out against the Staten Island grand jury decision not to indict Officer Daniel Pantaleo in that summer's chokehold death of Eric Garner.

See also
Betrayal
Fall guy
Scapegoating
Throw to the wolves

References

External links
 

American English idioms
English phrases
1982 neologisms
Political terminology of the United States